The Potez-CAMS 141 was a French long range reconnaissance flying boat of the late 1930s. Intended to equip the French Navy, only a single prototype was completed before the German invasion of France stopped production. That prototype did, however serve operationally from bases in French North Africa until scrapped in 1943.

Development and design
The Potez-CAMS 141 was designed by Chantiers Aéro-Maritimes de la Seine (or CAMS, which since 1933 had been part of Potez) to meet a 1935 French Navy specification for a long range marine reconnaissance flying boat to replace obsolete aircraft such as the Breguet Bizerte, competing against the Latécoère 611 and Breguet 730. The prototype first flew on 21 January 1938 at Caudebec-en-Caux, starting official trials in August 1938.

It was a four engined monoplane, powered by Hispano-Suiza 12Y engines, with a braced, high aspect ratio wing mounted above the fuselage and a twin tail. It was armed with a dorsal turret carrying two 7.5 mm Darne machine guns, with a further two machine guns in lateral "cheek" barbettes and two in waist positions. After evaluation, a production order for four aircraft was placed, with a further 15 being ordered before the start of the Second World War.

Operational history
The prototype, named Antarès, entered service with Escadrille E8 of the French Navy in September 1939, flying its first patrol mission over the Atlantic on 20 September 1939. Additional large orders for Potez-CAMS 141s were placed shortly after the start of the war, with delivery expected from June 1940, but these orders were cut back owing to changing priorities and the realisation that the loss rate of long range flying boats was very low.

No production aircraft had been completed by the time of the Armistice in June 1940, with Antarès being evacuated to Port Lyautey in Morocco. It was operated by the Vichy French Navy, serving with Escadrille 4E at Dakar, continuing in service until the Allied Invasion of North Africa, when after brief fighting, the French armed forces in North Africa joined with the Free French. Antarès continued in service, carrying out patrols over the Central and South Atlantic. On 2 June 1943, Antarès sank the  near Dakar. Antarès was retired and scrapped early in 1944.

Operators

French Navy

Specifications (Potez-CAMS 141)

See also

References

Bibliography

External links

Aviafrance

1930s French military reconnaissance aircraft
Flying boats
Four-engined tractor aircraft
Potez aircraft
CAMS aircraft
Parasol-wing aircraft
Aircraft first flown in 1938
Four-engined piston aircraft